Abascal is a Spanish surname. Notable people with the surname include:

Adriana Abascal (born 1970), Mexican model
Alejandro Abascal (born 1952), Spanish sailor
Amelia Abascal (born 1923), Mexican painter, sculptor and ceramist
Carlos Abascal (1949-2008), Mexican secretary of state
Graciela Abascal (born 1939), Mexican painter
José Fernando de Abascal y Sousa (1743–1821), Spanish viceroy of Peru
José Manuel Abascal (born  1958), Spanish runner
Nati Abascal (born 1943), Spanish model
Ricardo Gutiérrez Abascal (1888–1963), Spanish art critic
Salvador Abascal (1910-2000), Mexican politician
Santiago Abascal (born 1976), Spanish sociologist and politician
Silvia Abascal (born 1979), Spanish actress
Noelia Abascal Zorrilla (born 1986), Spanish oceanographer

Spanish-language surnames